Col. (rtd.) Dr. Tichaona Mudzingwa was the Zimbabwe Deputy Minister of Transport and Infrastructural Development. He died on April 10, 2012, at the age of 69.

References

2012 deaths
Year of birth missing